Alain Dostie (born September 12, 1943) is a Canadian cinematographer, film director and screenwriter. His work includes Silk, The Red Violin and The Confessional. He was nominated for a Genie Award for Best Achievement in Cinematography for his work in Silk.

Recognition 
 1987 Genie Award for Best Achievement in Cinematography - In the Shadow of the Wind (Les Fous de Bassan) - Nominated
 1993 Genie Award for Best Achievement in Cinematography - Thirty-Two Short Films About Glenn Gould - Won
 1996 Genie Award for Best Achievement in Cinematography - The Confessional - Nominated
 1999 Genie Award for Best Achievement in Cinematography - The Red Violin - Won
 1999 Jutra Award for Best Cinematography - The Red Violin - Won
 2001 Gemini Award for Best Photography in a Dramatic Program or Series - Nuremberg - Nominated
 2002 Jutra Award Best Cinematography - February 15, 1839 (15 février 1839) - Nominated
 2008 Genie Award for Best Achievement in Cinematography - Silk - Nominee

External links 
 
  Academy of Canadian Cinema and Television listing of wins/nominations by Alain Dostie

1943 births
Canadian cinematographers
Film directors from Quebec
Canadian screenwriters in French
Best Cinematography Genie and Canadian Screen Award winners
Living people
Best Cinematography Jutra and Iris Award winners